Belarus competed at the 1994 Winter Paralympics in Lillehammer, Norway. 2 competitors from Belarus won no medals and so did not place in the medal table.

See also 
 Belarus at the Paralympics
 Belarus at the 1994 Winter Olympics

References 

Belarus at the Paralympics
1994 in Belarusian sport
Nations at the 1994 Winter Paralympics